Emmalena is an unincorporated community within Knott County, Kentucky, United States. A post office was established on October 5, 1894. Its name is a blend of those of two women in the community: Emma Thurman, wife of the local school teacher who petitioned for the post office, and Orlena Combs Morgan, shopkeeper and first postmistress.

References

Unincorporated communities in Knott County, Kentucky
Unincorporated communities in Kentucky